Al Hilla Stadium is a multi-use stadium in Al Hillah, Iraq.  It is used mostly for football matches and serves as the home stadium of Babil SC and Al-Hilla SC. The stadium holds 3,000 people.

See also 
 List of football stadiums in Iraq

References

External links
 Venue information

Football venues in Iraq